President Harrison may refer to:
 William Henry Harrison (1773–1841), 9th president of the United States
 Presidency of William Henry Harrison, his presidency
 Benjamin Harrison (1833–1901), 23rd president of the United States and grandson of the 9th president
 Presidency of Benjamin Harrison, his presidency

See also
 
 Harrison (disambiguation)
 Harrison family of Virginia